Donousa (also Δενούσα Denousa), and sometimes spelled Donoussa, is an island and a former community in the Cyclades, Greece. Since the 2011 local government reform it is part of the municipality Naxos and Lesser Cyclades, of which it is a municipal unit. Donousa is the easternmost island of the Lesser Cyclades.

Geography
Its population is 167 inhabitants (2011 census), most of which live in the main settlement Donousa (also Stavros). Other villages include Mersini (on the southeastern coast), Kalotaritissa (near its northern coastline) and Charavgi (in the south).

History 
Tracing all the way back to ancient Greek mythology in the prehistoric times, Dionysus, the god of winemaking and wine, took Ariadne from Naxos to hide her from Theseus. There is also evidence of inhabitation on Donousa during the Early Cycladic period, around 3,000 BC.

The island during the Roman times, was additionally considered to be the place where exiles were deported. Later, it became the favourite hideout spot of Mediterranean pirates. Throughout time, the island was ruled by various civilisations including the Venetians and Turks.

Towns 
Agios Stavros is the main port and capital of Donousa. When visiting the Agios Stavros port and town, one will find a variety of taverns, cafes, bakeries, mini markets, rooms for rental and other touristic facilities.

Other towns and villages on the island include Kalotaritissa, Haravgi and Mersini.

References

Islands of Greece
Lesser Cyclades
Landforms of Naxos (regional unit)
Islands of the South Aegean
Populated places in Naxos (regional unit)